Adolph Hermann Friedmann (11 April 1873, in Białystok – 25 May 1957, in Heidelberg) was a German philosopher and jurist, Finnish citizen from 1906. In Finland Friedmann became known to the general public as a lawyer. His most famous case was a murder committed in 1927 in Turku. Friedmann defended the head of the University Library of Åbo Akademi and his wife in a murder trial, which was extensively reported in the newspapers around Europe.

Literary works 
 Die Welt der Formen. System eines morphologischen Idealismus, Gebr. Paetel, Berlin 1925, C. H. Beck, München 1930
 Wissenschaft und Symbol. Aufriss einer symbolnahen Wissenschaft, Biederstein C. H. Beck), München 1949
 Sinnvolle Odysee. Geschichte eines Lebens und einer Zeit (1873–1950), C. H. Beck, München 1950

See also
 International PEN

References

External links 
  
 
 Biographies. Kulturportal West–Ost (in German)

19th-century German philosophers
German jurists
People from Białystok
1873 births
1957 deaths
Riga Technical University alumni
German male writers
20th-century Finnish lawyers
German emigrants to Finland
Naturalized citizens of Finland